Albert Gottfried Friedrich Stahl (14 June 1889 – 19 December 1979) was a German officer in the army of Nazi Germany. He rose to the rank of Generalleutnant and he commanded the 714th Infantry Division between 2 May 1941 and 31 December 1942.

Biography 
Stahl was born on 14 June 1889 in Darmstadt. In 1909, he joined the Prussian Army, and on 14 September 1914 he was awarded with Iron Cross of 2nd class. He fought in the World War I for Germany.

Stahl was a  during the Nazi invasion of Poland. Later, during the Battle of France he was appointed to the staff of the 16th Army. In June 1942, he was sent to Balkans as commander of 714th Infantry Division in order to conduct anti-Partisan operations. He led the Kozara Offensive, a counter insurgency operation which severely damaged Partisan forces.

In 1945, he was taken as a prisoner of war by the US army. He was questioned at the Nuremberg trials as a witness.

References 

German Army generals of World War II
1889 births
1979 deaths
Lieutenant generals of the German Army (Wehrmacht)
Military personnel from Darmstadt
German Army personnel of World War I
Recipients of the Iron Cross (1914), 2nd class